Astomaea is a genus of flowering plants in the family Apiaceae, with 2 species. It is endemic to Southwest Asia.

Roots and bulbs of the Astoma seselifolia are often collected and then roasted and eaten.

Species
 Astomaea galiocarpa
 Astomaea seselifolia

References

Apioideae
Apioideae genera